The SMIC Private School is a private, coeducational K-12 school located in the Zhangjiang Science City of Shanghai, China.  The school was founded by Semiconductor Manufacturing International Corporation (SMIC) in 2001 and by 2009 had over 1,450 students. 2017 marked its 16th anniversary. The School is accredited by the Western Association of Schools and Colleges and the East Asia Regional Council of Schools.

History
The school was initially founded to provide education for the families of employees of the SMIC company. Since 2004, the school has been open for public enrollment.  

The school grew rapidly since its founding; the school had 75 students in the 1st year, and almost 700 students in its 4th year.  The school had its first English track graduating class of 7 in 2006. In 2009, the school had over 1800 students from 22 different countries. The school is authorized and approved by The U.S. College Board as an official SAT and AP testing center.  

The school provides two academic tracks: an international division that uses an American curriculum with a Chinese requirement and a Chinese track that is based on the local academic curriculum but with strong English emphasis. The SMIC Private School is accredited by the Pudong Board of Education and was awarded as an "Excellent Private Elementary School and Middle/High School in China" in December 2009.

In 2018, the school was at the center of a major food safety scandal in which its cafeteria contractor Eurest, a subsidiary of Compass Group, was found to have supplied expired and substandard food. During an inspection of the cafeteria, visiting parents of students at the school discovered moldy vegetables, expired seasoning, and food labeled with a production date in the future. The incident was reported in international media.

As a result of the incident, the school headmaster Zhu Ronglin and two other administrative staff members were dismissed and are currently under investigation by government authorities. Following the incident, Shanghai food safety authorities ordered an investigation of cafeterias across the city. Expired items were also found at Concordia International School Shanghai, whose supplier is also Eurest. As a result of the investigation, the schools were ordered to cut ties with Eurest.

In 2019, the school assigned a textbook to eighth grade students containing assignments for the winter break. Parents reported finding a lewd short story in the textbook titled "Mommy's Washcloth" which described a child seeing his father having extramarital oral sex with their maid. The publisher of the book has apologized and has fired the editor of the textbook. However, the school is still to be held liable for failing to properly scrutinize the textbook which was not government-approved. According to the Communist Party mouthpiece China Daily, "[the] school will be severely punished for the sexually oriented joke" by the education authority.

Facilities
The school is housed on a campus 80,293 square meters in size in Zhangjiang Science City of Shanghai. Academic facilities include: 2 libraries, 5 computer labs, an observatory, two auditoriums, and specialty classrooms for dance, music, and studio art. Athletic facilities include an indoor lap pool and recreation center, a gymnasium, tennis courts, all-weather basketball courts, and a 400-meter track.  These include:
 The Observatory is a unique feature of the School architecture. The school's astronomical observatory sits atop the Middle/High School building and is visible from the junction of Longdong Avenue and Guanglan Road. The observatory has a diameter of 8 meters. The round roof-top of the observatory protects the telescope and its accompanying equipment and facilitates a 360 degree view of the sky. The dome can be programmed to open or shut, as well as stop at a specific position during its navigation. The Observatory is now defunct.
 The Elementary School (ES) Auditorium can accommodate around 150 students.  It is used for regular school assemblies, for watching educational movies, and by teachers for their multimedia lessons.  The Middle/High School (MHS) also has two auditoriums, the seating capacity of each auditorium is about 400. They are used commonly for important school ceremonies and school-wide performances.
 The School has two libraries. One is for the Elementary School and the other is for the Middle/High School.
 The Gym is situated on the second floor of the building that houses the school cafeteria on the first floor. It has a standard size basketball court, and movable volleyball and badminton equipment. 
 The school cafeteria was set up in 2004 and can accommodate more than 700 students at present. It has been renovated twice – once in the summer of 2012, the other the summer of 2013.

Academics
The school offers preschool and kindergarten, elementary, and middle/high school education. The elementary and middle/high school divisions offer an international division and a Chinese track.

The middle and high school international divisions use Common Core and the AERO curriculum, which fulfills entrance requirements for United States colleges and universities. Combined enrollment with Chinese track students is offered for Chinese language classes, select elective courses, and sports teams. Students from both English and Chinese tracks come together rarely for weekly and school-wide events.

The school offers accelerated/honors and Advanced Placement in English, Mathematics, Science, History, and Chinese language. Advanced Placement courses include Psychology, Calculus AB/BC, Statistics, English Literature, English Language and Composition, Spanish, French, U.S. History, European History, World History, Computer Science A, Computer Science Principles, Chinese, Biology, Physics I, Physics II, Economics, Seminar, Research, Studio Art and Chemistry.

Students must complete 100 hours of community service to fulfill graduation requirements. Past opportunities have included volunteering at local Shanghai orphanages as well as coordinating a charity concert. Several school clubs, such as Community Service Club, offer community service hours for students who are members and participate in events. Some students volunteer as teachers' assistants during the English summer camps.

SMIC's newspaper, the Xin Lang Scholar, received first place for Best Front Page and Second Place Overall award from the American Scholastic Press Association (ASPA) during the 2004-2005 school year, and received First Place Overall with Special Merit during the 2009-2010 school year.

Co-curricular activities for middle and high school
Students run a variety of co-curricular clubs at the school.

High School Student Council
The High School Student Council is an elected representative body. It operates a co-op store and organizes student-oriented events throughout the year.

In 2017, the council organized a petition against the decision of the school's administration to introduce mandatory school uniforms without consultation with students, parents, and teachers. The 25-page bilingual policy paper garnered over 300 signatures. The school principal Kelley Ridings issued a response five months later, reiterating the administration's position and noting that "we appreciate this civil demonstration allowing positive exchange of views."

Student publications
The school's official publication is the Shark Scholar. The publication is a member of National Scholastic Press Association. The online publication is run by students in the Journalism elective, and in 2018 replaced the print publication XinLang Scholar, which had previously won First Place numerous times in the newspaper category of the American Scholastic Press Association.

Sharks2 is an unofficial student-run digital publication operated by the Sharks Digital Club, established in 2014. It provides periodical news and other digital services via a WeChat Official Account.

TEDxSMICSchool
TEDxSMICSchool is an independently organized TEDx event approved by TED, featuring an annual set of student and guest speakers sharing ideas focused around the annual theme. It was established in 2015 and is run by an unofficial student group.

Art Charity Program
The School started its annual Art Charity Program in 2004. In 2008, through a partnership of SMIC Private School students and SMIC employees, the School donated 88,000 RMB to help sick and needy children in its 5th annual Art Charity Program through the collection of more than 1,600 pieces of art.

Debate Club
The Debate Club participates in a number of intramural, regional, and national debate tournaments, including the SASDO held at the Shanghai American School Pudong.

Model United Nations
The SMIC School Model United Nations is the largest club in SMIC. It hosted its first SMICMUN Conference in 2014, and the conference grew steadily to accommodate around 100 delegates from both SMIC and other international school teams. MUN club members attend around 8-10 regional, national, and international conferences every year.

Computer Club 
Members of the computer club develop apps and programs.

Business Club 
Members of the Business Club explore economics, finance, and business. The Business Club has participated in the National Economic Challenge hosted by the Center for Economic Education, the Wharton Investment Contest hosted by the Wharton School of Business of the University of Pennsylvania, and various stock market simulators. Business Club is focused on starting its own non-profit business.

Athletics
The SMIC School is a member school of both SISAC and CISSA athletic conferences.  The SISAC conference is a competitive league primarily for high school students, while CISSA is participation based, non-competitive league primarily for students in grades 6 through 8. The SMIC Sharks are consistently one of the top performing schools in SISAC. Students from SMIC Private School participate in a variety of sports including volleyball, basketball, soccer, cross country, track and field, badminton, swimming, and table tennis. In 2018, the SMIC Private School's Boy's Varsity Volleyball team won first place in the SISAC tournament for the first time in the school's history.

Notable alumni

 Eric Chien, winner of the Grand Prix for close-up magic at FISM 2018
Jephanie Chen, goalkeeper and MVP of the China national team at the Women's Lacrosse World Cup 2018
 Dio Shin, TedX speaker and Cambridge University Varsity writer. 2023

Sister campus
The school has one sister campus in Beijing, which is run independently of the Shanghai campus.

The Beijing SMIC Private School was established in September 2005. The Beijing school is a Pre-K to Grade 9 school offering an English Track and a Chinese Track. The 28,000-square-meter campus is attended by 2,000 students and has an academic staff of 300. Like the Shanghai campus, its English Track offers an American curriculum with 280 students and 50 academic staff members. The average class size is 25 and the student-teacher ratio is 6:1. The school is open to enrollment from the public, and claims to "encourage [students'] efforts to aim for excellence, while retaining a sense of honor, community, and joy."

References

External links
 Official website of SMIC Private School

Private schools in China
International schools in Shanghai
Private schools in Shanghai